Puche is a surname. Notable people with the surname include:

Antonio Puche (born 1972), Spanish footballer and manager
Jaime Serra Puche (born 1951), Mexican economist
Montserrat Puche Díaz (born 1970), Spanish handball player
Miguel Puche (born 2001, Spanish footballer

See also
Pache